Anggi Airport  is an airport in Anggi, Indonesia.

References

Airports in West Papua (province)